The 2018 Bucknell Bison football team represented Bucknell University in the 2018 NCAA Division I FCS football season. They were led by ninth-year head coach Joe Susan and played their home games at Christy Mathewson–Memorial Stadium. They were a member of the Patriot League. They finished the season 1–10, 1–5 in Patriot League play to finish in last place.

Previous season
The Bison finished the 2017 season 5–6, 2–4 in Patriot League play to finish in sixth place.

Preseason

Preseason coaches poll
The Patriot League released their preseason coaches poll on July 26, 2018, with the Bison predicted to finish in a tie for fifth place.

Preseason All-Patriot League team
The Bison placed two players on the preseason all-Patriot League team.

Offense

Pat Finn – OL

Special teams

Alex Pechin – P

Schedule

Game summaries

William & Mary

Sacred Heart

at Penn

at Villanova

at Holy Cross

Colgate

at Monmouth

Lafayette

at Lehigh

at Georgetown

Fordham

References

Bucknell
Bucknell Bison football seasons
Bucknell Bison football